The 1942–43 season was Stoke City's eighth season in the non-competitive War League.

In 1939 World War II was declared and the Football League was cancelled. In its place were formed War Leagues and cups, based on geographical lines rather than based on previous league placement. However, none of these were considered to be competitive football, and thus their records are not recognised by the Football League and thus not included in official records.

Season review
In the 1942–43 season there were again two series of League competition a cup tournament. Stoke played 38 matches and were beaten in ten of those. They took 6th place in the first phase and 10th in the second. Their best result of the season was a 7–1 victory over Walsall in mid December and two 6–1 wins over nearby Crewe Alexandra. Frank Mountford was leading scorer with 20 whilst both Frank Bowyer and Fred Basnett hit 18.

Results

Stoke's score comes first

Legend

Football League North 1st Phase

Football League North 2nd Phase

Football League War Cup

Squad statistics

References

Stoke City F.C. seasons
Stoke City